Cabela's Big Game Hunter 2012 is a hunting video game developed by Cauldron and published by Activision for the PlayStation 3, Wii and Xbox 360 in 2011.

Gameplay
The game takes place in five different locations: Montana, Mexico, Texas, Namibia and Alaska. Each location features three different primary days with five different hunts available from the start of the region. The game features a big variety of environments available including lush forests, dry deserts, craggy mountains, flooded plains, scorching savannas and the freezing tundra. The game also features multiple scenarios where "decisions" will have to be made. Each region features a variety of animals each specific to the environments in which can be hunted throughout the game.

The game incorporates many new and returning elements not found in previous main series games, such as having shooting blinds, shooting rests and tree stands, a caller, and other things to aid the player. "Hunter Sense" returns, and now upon finding evidence, the player creates a flashback in the form of a black-and-white moving image of the animal's last known location and what that animal was doing. But other new things are implemented in this game to work against the player, such as animals now having some of the most improved and most realistic AI in any game, meaning they could easily see, smell, or hear you if you make a wrong move. Similar to Dangerous Hunts, predators can now randomly surprise the player by jumping out of a bush or off a cliff, so the player's "killer instinct" slow-motion mode activates, turning the player towards the animal to shoot before it lands a hit. Getting to your target is now more challenging with the implementation of stealth hunts and timed hunts. Stealth hunts are when the males are not within reach and the player must use stealth and cover (usually thick bushes, logs, and rock formations) to avoid females, noisy terrain, and other animals like birds. The player is also given a device called a UTD that measures your presence to the animals. A low-pitched beep means that the animals are calm and can't detect you, medium-pitched beeps indicate that animals are starting to detect your presence, and high-pitched beeps tell the player that animals have clearly spotted the player and they are about to run away. A timed hunt is activated either when you reach your target, a predator or another force that could disturb the animals appears and the player must kill the target in a certain amount of time; or when the animals appear as a large herd and the player must kill a certain number of males before time runs out. Many birds and small mammals roam around for the player to shoot at their leisure. Sometimes the player can reach a hidden area, where they have an opportunity to photograph rare animals and natural behaviors. There's also a gun store where players can buy, customize, and upgrade their weapons.

The game also features multiplayer where players can create or customize their own map from a template (based on campaign or gallery) or from scratch. Players can place trees, foliage, water, terrain formations, and animals found in the game or create custom animals, which they can hunt with friends with online connectivity. Players can set challenges to compete in hunting the rarest animals and like Campaign mode, players can also buy and customize their weapons for each type of situation (a typical weapon is usually a variation of a scoped bolt-action hunting rifle). There are multiple shooting galleries like arcade, where you can kill as many animals as want, target, which you can use to practice your marksmanship by shooting wood cutouts of animal targets, or reflex which tests your hunting skills by instructing the player to kill certain animals in a chronological order. The game was released packaged with the Top Shot Elite, a plastic peripheral for the Wii controller.

Story
Twenty-five-year-old John Sharp, a rookie big game hunter, is invited to participate in the Cabela's 2012 International Safari hosted by John Hathcock, a high-ranking member of the Order of Orion, an elite club of world-class big game hunters from all over the world. The player starts in Montana, Sharp's homeland, where he hunts red deer, white-tailed deer, pronghorn, and hunt an elk before wolves scare it away. The next day a wounded mountain lion terrorizes the area, and Sharp must kill it. The player heads to Mexico, where he hunts whitetail, bighorn sheep, pronghorn, and mule deer. After taking shelter in an arroyo during a sandstorm, Sharp finds boot tracks, confident that someone trespassed into his zone. Just as he's approaching a bison herd, a rifle fires and misses, scaring them off. It's revealed Matisse fired, trying to make Sharp miss his chance. The two argue, but Hathcock shames them.

Then the player goes to Hathcock's private ranch in Texas, hunting white-tailed deer, mule deer, elk, wild boar, bison, and moose. The radio gets a distress call from Freidkin, with Hathcock telling Sharp to check it out. Sharp finds that Freidkin's stand was knocked over by a startled bison, making him fall 70 feet down into a gorge. Sharp must then defend him from meat-craving boars until medical assistance arrives. Freidkin is taken to a hospital, where his left leg is amputated, making him drop out. The player goes to Namibia, where he hunts blackbuck, impala, zebra, wildebeest, greater kudu, White rhino and Cape buffalo. Sharp comes across lion tracks, confirming that a hunting pride is scouring the area. Sharp hears as Cassidy alerts everyone that he and his kill are surrounded by lions. As Cassidy starts to panic, Sharp instructs him to abandon his trophy and jump into a nearby ravine. There are several roars and a scream as several birds are flushed from the trees. Sharp runs to the site, finding nothing but Cassidy's rifle and pack with smears of blood. Sharp sees the male lion in the distance, and must dispatch the lionesses. He's then ambushed by the lion, and as he's about to kill Sharp a shot fires, and the lion pauses and falls to his side. Sharp sits up and sees Matisse, revealing he shot the lion for himself, saving his life. Authorities scour the area, but Cassidy's body is never found.

The player and Matisse finally go to Kodiak Island in Alaska, the final location as an approaching Arctic blizzard threatens the cancel the tournament. Meanwhile, a man-eating grizzly bear named Bloody Ben has been terrorizing the island for the last decade, and poses a huge threat to the hunters, spectators, and game animals in the area. The player hunts red deer, Sitka deer, elk, Dall sheep, caribou, and moose. In the midst of the blizzard, Sharp finally finds Ben's tracks, and just as he's about to shoot, a man jumps in front of his scope, revealed to be Matisse. He aggravates the bear by shooting twice, but is mauled. Sharp runs to Matisse, badly injured and passed out. Sharp is then startled by the bear, and jumps to the ground for his rifle as Bloody Ben closes in for the kill. Sharp kills Ben after shooting him 6 times in his vitals. Matisse wakes up, only to see Sharp looking at him with a confident smirk and Bloody Ben dead behind him. Matisse admits defeat to Sharp and apologizes for everything he's done. Sharp then sells Ben's skin to the Order, and he uses the money to go to Hawaii the next summer. The game ends.

Trivia 
The Cape buffalo is misidentified as a water buffalo, and the trophy score one has four horns in the photo.
The golden eagle is the only small game animal that will give you a penalty if shot at.
This game is the first appearance of the gray wolf, bison, wild boar, zebra and wildebeest in the Big Game Hunter series.
This is the only Cabela's game to feature the UTD.
This is the last Big Game Hunter series game released on the Wii.
All international versions of the game were localized in Activision's Dublin office.

2011 video games
Cabela's video games
Hunting video games
Video games developed in Slovakia
PlayStation 3 games
Wii games
Xbox 360 games
Video games set in Africa
Video games set in North America